Sawtooth Peak is a jagged mountain rising to a height of . It is a landmark of the Mineral King region of the Sierra Nevada, in Sequoia National Park. In the past, it was known as Miner's Peak. It contains a supply of gold and mercury.

Hiking 
The trailhead up to Sawtooth Peak starts in Mineral King, 23 miles off of the 198 on Mineral King Road. The trailhead is located at the end of Mineral King Road in a parking lot/staging area. The trail up to the peak is 11.5 miles round trip and is rated difficult. The last half-mile of the trail is mainly loose gravel and steep switchbacks. The base of the trail is at 7800 Ft elevation and climbs up to 12,400 Ft at the top of the pass. Hiking is recommended from May to October. Permits are required for overnight stay.

Climbing 

The easiest approach is from the valley to Sawtooth Pass, and then up the northwest slope of the peak. It was first climbed by Joseph Lovelace during a deer hunt in 1871.

Today, this approach follows an established trail to Sawtooth Pass, then continues on a cross-country route to the peak. The section of trail from Monarch Lakes to Sawtooth Pass is steep and marred by granite sand, and as such is prone to erosion. The trailhead, shared with the Timber Gap trail, is located in the Mineral King Valley, about 1/2 mile (0.80 km) uphill from the Ranger Station.

Climate
According to the Köppen climate classification system, Sawtooth Peak is located in an alpine climate zone. Most weather fronts originate in the Pacific Ocean, and travel east toward the Sierra Nevada mountains. As fronts approach, they are forced upward by the peaks (orographic lift), causing them to drop their moisture in the form of rain or snowfall onto the range.

References

External links
 
 

Mountains of Sequoia National Park
Mountains of Tulare County, California
Mountains of Northern California
Sierra Nevada (United States)
North American 3000 m summits